Protection of telomeres protein 1 is a protein that in humans is encoded by the POT1 gene.

Function 

This gene is a member of the telombin family and encodes a nuclear protein involved in telomere maintenance. Specifically, this protein functions as a member of a multi-protein complex known as shelterin, that binds to the TTAGGG repeats of telomeres, regulating telomere length and protecting chromosome ends from illegitimate recombination, catastrophic chromosome instability, and abnormal chromosome segregation. Alternatively spliced transcript variants have been described.

The absence of POT1 in mouse embryonic fibroblasts and chicken cells leads to a detrimental DNA damage response on telomeres resulting in telomere dysfunction-induced foci (TIFs). POT1 is required for telomere protection because it allows for telomere inhibition of DNA damage response factors. The protein also serves a role in the regulation of telomerase activity on telomeres. In vitro experiments utilizing human POT1 have shown that reduction in POT1 levels result in the elongation of telomeres.

Interactions 

POT1 has been shown to interact with ACD and TINF2.

Pathology 

Increased transcriptional expression of this gene is associated with stomach carcinogenesis and its progression. 
Mutations in this gene have also been associated to the acquisition of the malignant features of chronic lymphocytic leukemia.
POT1 loss-of-function variants predispose to familial melanoma and glioma.

References

Further reading

External links 
 PDBe-KB provides an overview of all the structure information available in the PDB for Human Protection of telomeres protein 1  (POT1)

Telomere-binding proteins